Sandside was a railway station situated on the Hincaster Branch of the Furness Railway serving the hamlet and quarries of Sandside. The following station was Heversham, which was the last on the branch before the line joined what is now known as the West Coast Main Line at Hincaster Junction, south of Oxenholme.

A Furness Railway local passenger train service (known locally as the Kendal Tommy for much of its life) operated through Sandside from Grange-over-Sands to Kendal between 1876 and its withdrawal in May 1942, when the station also closed to passengers.  In July 1922, this FR service ran five times per day in each direction on weekdays.  Through goods traffic ended in 1963 and the track was lifted north of here three years later, although the remaining stub down to Arnside was retained until final closure in 1972 to serve local quarries.

Notes

References

Services

Disused railway stations in Cumbria
Former Furness Railway stations
Railway stations in Great Britain opened in 1876
Railway stations in Great Britain closed in 1942
Beetham